The Kalev class consisted of two mine laying submarines built for the Estonian Navy.

Development history

The newly independent Republic of Estonia followed the Finnish naval armament program and the common top secret defence cooperation in acquiring submarines. Unlike the German-designed Finnish subs, Estonia opted for British-built submarines.

Service history
The two subs were ordered in 1934 and delivered in 1937. After the Soviet annexation of Estonia in 1940 the Estonian Navy was integrated into the Soviet Baltic Fleet. The Kalev-class submarines were commissioned into the Soviet Navy on September 18, 1940. Kalev was sunk outside Hanko, Finland in 1941, but Lembit continued a successful campaign against Swedish iron ore transports to Germany. Lembit was decommissioned in 1979. She is now preserved as a museum ship at the Estonian Maritime Museum Lennusadam (Seaplane harbour/Hydroplane port), Tallinn.

As a museum exhibit

See also
Estonian Navy
Finnish–Estonian defense cooperation
EML Kalev (1936)
ENS Lembit

References

External links

 Submarine Lembit - Estonian Maritime Museum
 Kalev-class submarine (Kalev or Lembit) 
 The Vickers Photographic Archive (search for Kalev)
 Lembit Submarine - Tallinn
 Allied Warships - Kalev class

Submarine classes
 
 
Military history of Estonia